Carl Haag (20 April 1820 – 24 January 1915) was a Bavarian-born painter who became a naturalized British subject and was court painter to the duke of Saxe-Coburg and Gotha.

Biography
Haag was born in Erlangen, in the Kingdom of Bavaria, and was trained in the Academy of Fine Arts Nuremberg and at Munich. He initially practised as an illustrator and as a painter in oils of portraits and architectural subjects; but in 1847 he settled in England, where he studied English watercolour techniques. After this he devoted himself to watercolours.

In 1850 was elected an associate of the Royal Society of Painters in Water Colours before becoming a full member in 1853. He also enjoyed the patronage of Queen Victoria.
Between 1858 and 1860, he travelled to the Middle East, at first staying for more than a year in Cairo where he shared a studio with artist, Frederick Goodall. Later he journeyed to Jerusalem, Lebanon and Syria before returning to Cairo. During this period, he made many sketches which he worked up into paintings after returning to London. He returned to Egypt in 1873-74 to gather inspiration for further Oriental paintings.

He was a prolific and important painter of Holy Land scenes. He gained a considerable reputation for his firmly drawn and meticulously elaborated paintings of Eastern subjects. Some of his depictions of the Middle East are in the Israel Museum's collection. In 1903, he retired and towards the end of his life, Haag left England and returned to the newly united German Empire, where he died in Oberwesel.

Selected works 

 Evening in Balmoral
 The Sudden Shock in the Desert
 The Danger in the Desert
 The Ruins of Baalbek
 Panorama of Palmyra
 Beduin Devotion
 Ouposts in Montenegro
 Reading the Koran
 Morning in the Highlands
 Bachist, a Howazeen Bedawee and Mabzookh, his Little Son
 A Nubian harper
 Greek Warrior
 Adullah Chief of Said Pasha's Bodyguard

See also

 List of Orientalist artists
 Orientalism

Sources 
  This work in turn cites:
 John Lewis Roget, A History of the Old Water-Colour Society, now the Royal Society of Painters in Water Colours (two volumes, London, 1891)

References

External links 

 

1820 births
1915 deaths
19th-century British painters
19th-century German painters
20th-century German painters
20th-century German male artists
Artists' Rifles soldiers
Academy of Fine Arts, Nuremberg alumni
British male painters
Court painters
German male painters
Orientalist painters
19th-century German male artists
19th-century British male artists